Sangweni is an African surname that may refer to
Phindiwe Sangweni (born 1963), South African attorney and businesswoman 
Siyabonga Sangweni (born 1981), South African football defender 
Thamsanqa Sangweni (born 1989), South African football midfielder 

Surnames of African origin